Erminio "Mimo" Costa (March 9, 1924 – November 28, 2009) was an Italian-American neuroscientist. His research interests covered brain serotonergic activity in health and disease, benzodiazepine-GABA interactions, benzodiazepine action at GABAA receptors, neurophysiological role of neurosteroids, and GABAergic dysfunction and changes in the expression of reelin and GAD67 in schizophrenia. He published more than 1,000 articles. The June 2011 issue of the journal Neuropharmacology was dedicated to him.

Career

July 1947 - M.D. 110/110 cum laude, University of Cagliari, Italy
1950-1960 - Thudichum Psychiatric Research Laboratory, Galesburg Research Hospital, Galesburg, Illinois
1960-1965 - Deputy Chief, Laboratory of Chemical Pharmacology at NHLI - NIH, Bethesda, Maryland
1965-1968 - Associate Professor of Pharmacology and Neurology, College of Physicians and Surgeons of Columbia University, New York, NY
1968-1985 - Chief of the Laboratory of Preclinical Pharmacology, NIMH, St. Elizabeths Hospital, Washington, DC
1985-1994 - Director and Founder, Institute of Neuroscience, and Professor of Pharmacology, Georgetown University, Washington, DC
1994-1995 - Director, Center for Neuropharmacology, Nathan Kline Institute for Psychiatric Research, New York University, New York, NY
1995 - Scientific Director, Psychiatric Institute, Professor of Biochemistry in Psychiatry, Department of Psychiatry, College of Medicine, University of Illinois at Chicago, Chicago, Illinois
1982 - Member, National Academy of Sciences 
1991 - Member of "Accademia dei Lincei" founded by Galileo Galilei in 1602, Rome

Books
 Advances in Biochemical Psychopharmacology (1969)
 Biochemistry and Pharmacology of the Basal Ganglia (1966)
 Biochemistry of Simple Neuronal Models (1970)
 Neurosteroids and Brain Function (1991)
 The Endorphins - Vol. 18  (1985)

See also
Bernard Brodie, in whose laboratory Costa worked for a time.

References

External links
Erminio Costa, M.D.
Obituary—Erminio Costa, M.D. (1924-2009), University of Illinois at Chicago - obituary at Schizophrenia Research Forum

1924 births
2009 deaths
Italian neuroscientists
Members of the United States National Academy of Sciences
People from Cagliari
University of Cagliari alumni
American neuroscientists
Italian emigrants to the United States